The 2016 Citizen Soldier 400 was a NASCAR Sprint Cup Series race that was held on October 2, 2016, at Dover International Speedway in Dover, Delaware. Contested over 400 laps on the one-mile (1.6 km) concrete speedway, it was the 29th race of the 2016 NASCAR Sprint Cup Series season, third race of the Chase and final race of the Round of 16.

Report

Background

Dover International Speedway (formerly Dover Downs International Speedway) is a race track in Dover, Delaware, United States. Since opening in 1969, it has held at least two NASCAR races. In addition to NASCAR, the track also hosted USAC and the Verizon IndyCar Series. The track features one layout, a  concrete oval, with 24° banking in the turns and 9° banking on the straights. The speedway is owned and operated by Dover Motorsports.

The track, nicknamed "The Monster Mile", was built in 1969 by Melvin Joseph of Melvin L. Joseph Construction Company, Inc., with an asphalt surface, but was replaced with concrete in 1995. Six years later in 2001, the track's capacity moved to 135,000 seats, making the track have the largest capacity of sports venue in the mid-Atlantic. In 2002, the name changed to Dover International Speedway from Dover Downs International Speedway after Dover Downs Gaming and Entertainment split, making Dover Motorsports. From 2007 to 2009, the speedway worked on an improvement project called "The Monster Makeover", which expanded facilities at the track and beautified the track. After the 2014 season, the track's capacity was reduced to 95,500 seats.

Entry list

First practice

Qualifying
Qualifying for Friday was cancelled due to rain. Brad Keselowski was awarded the pole position as a result.

Starting lineup

Practice (post-qualifying)

Second practice

Final practice
Final practice was cancelled due to rain.

Race

First half

Under overcast Delaware skies, Brad Keselowski led the field to the green flag at 2:17 p.m. He held the lead for the first few laps until Martin Truex Jr. passed him going into turn 1 with ease to take the lead on the seventh lap. Kyle Busch powered by Truex in turn 2 on the outside to take the lead on lap 21. Debris coming from Kevin Harvick's car brought out the first caution of the race on lap 34. The issue was a flat right-rear tire related to a broken track bar mount. Trevor Bayne was sent to the tail end of the field for speeding on pit road. Kyle Larson fell down a lap after making a stop to deal with electrical issues. He said after the race that he didn't "know what happened with the battery or whatever. If we didn’t have the (penalty), we probably would have been alright because I was only a lap down. Nice little Christmas present for Austin (Dillon) there with both Ganassi cars going down."

The race restarted on lap 40. Busch held the lead for nearly 40 laps before Truex retook it on lap 80, but Busch powered by him to take it back on lap 81. The second caution of the race flew on lap 104 for Ryan Blaney hitting the wall exiting turn 2.

The race restarted on lap 111. Truex worked under Busch in turn 2 to retake the lead on lap 130. Jamie McMurray was running 10th when he reported engine issues and started falling back on lap 167. The third caution of the race flew on lap 182 for Larson suffering a right-front tire blowout and slamming the wall in turn 1. He said afterwards that there wasn't much he "could do. I cut the right-front tire down and got in the wall and still had good speed in the race car after that but it just didn’t work out. Our team has come a long way this season from where we started the year. We were pretty awful at the start of the season but then got a win at Michigan to lock ourselves in the Chase. That was good. I know we have the speed to have made it past a couple of rounds but it’s my typical luck I guess, where it just doesn’t work out.”

The race restarted on lap 190. Jimmie Johnson beat Truex on the restart to take the lead on the ensuing lap. McMurray brought out the fourth caution of the race after suffering an engine failure on the frontstretch. He said afterwards that the engine "vibrated earlier in the race and it went away. And it's weird because engine issues usually don't go away. It felt like it had power and then I don't know about 40 laps before it finally blew up, it just started vibrating real bad. Very unfortunate. It is just the way it goes. The No. 42 had their problem early in the race and then at that point I'm like, ‘Well it's kind of Austin (Dillon) and I that are going to battle this out.’ Our cars are pretty close so this is going to be a pretty good battle down to the end.” He also added that keeping the car out as long as he did with engine issues was "wishful thinking at that point. No one wants to stay out and blow up, not to oil the track down. Also it's hard to diagnose the problem if the motor's blown up. Because you're in a position this weekend where you just have to go for it and what you hope is you've got something as simple as a plug wire or a spark plug that you can replace and the motor's not going to grenade. We came here and looked at it, and actually on the digital dash, we have a little diagnosis page and nothing is showing up, so we didn't know what was wrong. We were just going to salvage as long as we could." He went on to finish 40th.

Second half

The race restarted on lap 199. Green flag stops started on lap 277. Johnson pitted from the lead on lap 279 and handed it to Keselowski. He pitted the next lap and handed the lead to Greg Biffle. He pitted on lap 287 and the lead cycled to Truex. Johnson was handed a pass through penalty for his crew being over the wall too soon. After the race, he said that what happened was "a unique circumstance on pit road. We had the No. 18 in the pit before us getting ready to pull out, the No. 43 leaving his stall. I got slowed up and had to check up and get behind two cars and unfortunately, I think it just threw the rhythm off of the pit stop."

The final round of green flag stops began with 43 laps to go. Truex pitted from the lead with 36 laps to go and handed it to Johnson. He pitted with 34 to go and handed the lead to Jeff Gordon. He pitted with 27 laps to go and the lead cycled back to Truex. David Ragan was handed a pass through penalty for speeding on pit road.

Truex drove on to score the victory.

Post-race

Driver comments

Truex said in victory lane that he "can't even believe it man -- it’s just living a dream right now. It’s a fairytale. I don’t even know what to say" and that his team just needs "to go out there each week and try to be as prepared as we can. We’re not going to change who we are. We didn’t do that before the Chase started. We just got hot and we got momentum, and hopefully we don’t lose it. I mean, I don’t know how we got it, I don’t know how to keep it, I just know that we’re going to continue to approach these races the same way, and hopefully it works out for us.”

“What an awesome weekend for us, I love this place,” he added in the media center following the race. “I’ve had a lot of heartbreaks since my first win here back in ’07. I’ve had a lot of heartbreaks. I’ve led a lot of laps. I’ve been in position to win multiple times, and it never seemed to work out for multiple reasons. Today I’m just thankful to have a great team, to have been able to lead lap 400 and get back to victory lane at a track that’s so special to me.”

After advancing into the Round of 12 with an eighth-place finish, Austin Dillon said that his team "just stayed focused, and once again, God just blessed us because I'm still awestruck. Things like this just don't happen. I'm proud to be going on to the final 12 and having race cars that are capable of keep on moving on.”

Following his first top-10 finish in relief for Dale Earnhardt Jr., Gordon said of his 10th-place finish that he "felt like we had a really good race car all weekend long,’’ Gordon told NBC Sports after the race. “I realized real early on we were going to have our work cut out for us, starting 18th. It was really tough getting through traffic. I kind of led them down a path. We were loose that first run and over-tightened it and that didn’t do us any favors. But we got it tuned up and had some great pit stops and got our way into the top 10. I wanted to get a top-10 in this car before my time in the car is over. We got that. Now let’s go get a top-five or something better at Martinsville.’’

"We were much better than we were yesterday [in practice]," Tony Stewart said after being knocked out of his final Chase appearance with a 13th-place finish. "[I'm] really proud of our team. We kept making it better all day. That is good as we had."

Race results

Race summary
 Lead changes: 6 among different drivers
 Cautions/Laps: 4 for 22
 Red flags: 0
 Time of race: 3 hours, 3 minutes and 15 seconds
 Average speed:

Media

Television
NBCSN covered the race on the television side. Rick Allen, Jeff Burton, and Steve Letarte had the call in the booth for the race. Dave Burns, Mike Massaro, Marty Snider and Kelli Stavast handled pit road on the television side.

Radio
MRN had the radio call for the race, which was simulcast on Sirius XM NASCAR Radio.

Standings after the race

Drivers' Championship standings

Manufacturers' Championship standings

Note: Only the first 16 positions are included for the driver standings.

References

2016 in sports in Delaware
2016 NASCAR Sprint Cup Series
NASCAR races at Dover Motor Speedway
October 2016 sports events in the United States